Nihan Anaz (born 29 April 1979) played for Turkish National Basketbal team. Turkish League Scoring leader. World Champions with her high school Bogazici Lisesi.

South Carolina and California statistics

Source

Honors
Turkish Women's Basketball League
Winners (1): 2004-05

See also
 Turkish women in sports

References

Yenilgiyi Kabullenemeyen Bir Takım Kadrosuna Sahibiz bayanbasket.com

External links
California Golden Bears bio
Profile at tbl.org.tr

1979 births
Living people
Beşiktaş women's basketball players
California Golden Bears women's basketball players
Galatasaray S.K. (women's basketball) players
Migrosspor basketball players
Panküp TED Kayseri Koleji basketball players
Shooting guards
South Carolina Gamecocks women's basketball players
Sportspeople from Ankara
Turkish expatriate basketball people in the United States
Turkish women's basketball players
Weatherford College alumni